Specialist Subject Records is an English independent record label initially founded in Leeds in 2007, but based largely in Exeter since being revived in 2009. They have been described as a "powerhouse" of DIY Indie Rock.

History

Specialist Subject started in 2007 to release one 7" by the band Magnus Magnusson.

In 2009 the label was revived in Exeter as a method of self releasing Horne's band Bangers, as well as those by friends' bands such as Caves. For some time Specialist Subject had an office in the centre of the city. Since opening a record shop in Bristol in August 2017 the label has been run from its premises upstairs at the music venue Exchange in the Old Market area of Bristol.

The label has mostly seen releases by up-and-coming British bands such as Doe, Muncie Girls, and Fresh; but it has also put out the UK editions of albums by acts from other anglophone countries such as The Smith Street Band (Australia), Jeff Rosenstock (USA), and Pillow Queens (Ireland).

Artists with releases by Specialist Subject
Above Them
Adult Magic
AJJ
American Enthusiasm
The Arteries
Austeros
Bad Sleep
Bangers
Caves
Doe
Dogeyed
Don't Worry
The Fairweather Band
Fresh
Garden Centre
Grand Pop
Great Cynics
Hard Girls
Hovvdy
Jesus and his Judgemental Father
Martha
Muncie Girls
Neurotic Fiction
Onsind
Pale Angels
Personal Best
Pillow Queens
Jeff Rosenstock
Shit Present
Slingshot Dakota
The Smith Street Band
Soot Sprite
Ssssnakes
Supermilk
Toodles & the Hectic Pity
Twisted
Witching Waves
Woahnows

References 

Underground punk scene in the United Kingdom
British independent record labels
Alternative rock record labels
Punk record labels
Indie rock record labels
Record labels established in 2007